mRNA-decapping enzyme 1A is a protein that in humans is encoded by the DCP1A gene.

Decapping is a key step in general and regulated mRNA decay. The protein encoded by this gene is a decapping enzyme. This protein and another decapping enzyme form a decapping complex, which interacts with the nonsense-mediated decay factor hUpf1 and may be recruited to mRNAs containing premature termination codons. This protein also participates in the TGF-beta signaling pathway.

Interactions 

DCP1A has been shown to interact with DCP2 and UPF1. It has also been shown to colocalize with GW182, and other markers of P-body. Human DCP1A is heterotrimeric, and makes contacts with the scaffold EDC3/4. The Arabidopsis thaliana homolog interacts with the plant specific type XI myosin motor protein.

References

Further reading